The 2021 Swedish Golf Tour, branded the Nordic Golf Tour, was the 36th season of the Swedish Golf Tour, a series of professional golf tournaments for women held in Sweden.

The tournaments also featured on the 2021 LET Access Series (LETAS).

Schedule
The schedule had a reduced number of tournaments and was subject to change due to the COVID-19 pandemic.

Ranking
The ranking was called the Road to Skaftö Open, and the top two players Lily May Humphreys and Sofie Bringner received wildcards to the Skaftö Open played 26–29 August on the 2021 Ladies European Tour.

Source:

See also
2021 Ladies European Tour

References

External links
Official homepage of the Swedish Golf Tour

Swedish Golf Tour (women)
Swedish Golf Tour (women)